Hojatolah Zadmahmoud (born September 13, 1983) is an Iranian football midfielder who currently plays for Gostaresh Foolad F.C. in the Azadegan League.

Club career

Club career statistics
Last update  4 May 2011 

 Assist Goals

References

1983 births
Living people
Iranian footballers
Association football midfielders
Persian Gulf Pro League players
Azadegan League players
Esteghlal Ahvaz players
Sepahan S.C. footballers
Foolad FC players